NatSKA (The National Schools and Youth Group Karting Association) was formed over forty years ago in the north east, by a group of like minded people intent on making motorsport accessible to schoolchildren. One of their primary objectives was to make kart racing as affordable to as many people as possible whilst maintaining a high level of competition.

Kart racing in schools has existed since the late sixties. NatSKA is a nationwide association that holds race meetings throughout the country at major racetracks such as Blackbushe, Glan-y-Gors, Kimbolton, Rowrah, Rye House, Buckmore park and Whilton Mill. The association has 27 teams as far apart as Tyne and Wear through to Kent and Devon. In March 2008, St Michael's, a school which was a member of the NatSKA, had three karts stolen from their school base. Tarporley Karting Team had three karts stolen in 2019 from their school base.

All race meetings are run by NatSKA under the authority of the Motorsport UK (MSUK) who are responsible for all motor sport in the United Kingdom, including British Touring Cars, Formula 3, Formula Renault and all motorcycle racing including the Moto GP British Grand Prix.

Karting as a school activity covers a wide range of educational, academic, technological, social and sporting subjects. 

NatSKA currently runs twelve classes:

Class 1: Iame Cadet
Class 4: Honda GX160 Cadet
Class 7: 100cc Piston Ported (TKM BT82 or Yamaha KT100)
Class 8: 100cc Rotary/Reed/Piston Ported
Class 10: Comer 60 Box Stock
Class 11: 4 Stroke Direct Drive (non-gearbox) Junior
Class 12: 4 Stroke Direct Drive (non-gearbox) Junior Experienced
Class 13: 4 Stroke Highly Modified Direct Drive
Class 14: Raket 85 Box Stock
Class 15: Rotax Max/Junior Max

Former Classes:
Class 1: 50cc Single Ratio Restricted
Class 3: 50cc Gearbox Restricted
Class 2: Honda C70, C90 and C90 Cub Direct Drive
Class 4: 50cc Gearbox Open
Class 5: Comer 80 Box Stock
Class 6: 100cc Low Power (max 12.5 BHP as manufactured)
Class 9: 125cc Gearbox
Class 16: Honda C70, C90 and C90 Cub Gearbox

Drivers who started in NatSKA and have competed successfully in higher formulas

 Anthony Rodgers (Queen Elizabeth High School Middleton 1980’s) FF1600, Formula Vauxhall Lotus, Pental Ginetta, British GT, Britcar Endurance, Britcar Trophy, 750mc Roadsports and Club Enduro.

References

External links 
NatSKA website
St Michaels Kart Racing Club
Tarporley Karting Team
All Hallows and Macclesfield Schools Kart Club
UK Karting

Kart racing organizations
School sport in the United Kingdom
Youth sport in England
Youth sport in Wales